Cloghernagh at , does not have the prominence to qualify as an Arderin, but does have the prominence to be the 40th–highest peak on the Vandeleur-Lynam scale.  Cloghernagh is situated in the southern sector of the Wicklow Mountains range, and is part of the large massif of Lugnaquilla , Wicklow's highest mountain.

Cloghernagh's northern side forms the steep southern walls and cliffs of the scenic U-shaped hanging valley of Fraughan Rock Glen, which then falls into the Glenmalure valley below; the scenic high corrie lake of Arts Lough , lies high on its north eastern flank.  Cloghernagh forms a "horseshoe" around the Fraughan Rock Glen with Lugnaquillia and Benleagh , and another "horseshoe shape" around the glen of the Carrawaystick River with Corrigasleggaun , and the corrie lake of Kelly's Lough.

Bibliography

Gallery

See also

Wicklow Way
Wicklow Round
Wicklow Mountains
Lists of mountains in Ireland
List of mountains of the British Isles by height

References

External links
MountainViews: The Irish Mountain Website, Cloghernagh
MountainViews: Irish Online Mountain Database
The Database of British and Irish Hills , the largest database of British Isles mountains ("DoBIH")
Hill Bagging UK & Ireland, the searchable interface for the DoBIH

Mountains and hills of County Wicklow
Hewitts of Ireland
Mountains under 1000 metres